Johannes Henoch Neethling (1770-1838) was a South African Cape Supreme Court Judge and Grand Master of the Freemasons in South Africa.

Roots and education
Neethling was born 1 August 1770 in South Africa. He was the son of Christiaan Ludolph Neethling and Maria Magdalena Neethling  Storm.  He married Anna Catharina Smuts, daughter of Johannes Coenraad Smuts and Magdalena Elizabeth Wernich. His brothers grandson was named after him. This grandson was a pastor in the Dutch Reformed Church and founder of Paul Roos Gymnasium. His school education was in the Netherlands as his father sent him there for a Christian education. He obtained a PhD in law in 1791 at Leiden University.

Career in law
He practised as an advocate. Neethling was a Judge, firstly of the Court of Justice in 1825. Richard Plasket, the Cape Colonial Secretary in 1825, was not satisfied with the existing Court. A commission of inquiry were set up, which was led by J. T. Bigge and W. M. G. Colebrooke. They suggested a new court system.  A Supreme Court was established out of the commission’s recommendations in January 1828. As they were looking for academically well qualified judges, Neethling, who had a PhD in law, was appointed as one of the Supreme Court judges.

Other activities
Apart from practising law, he was joined by D. G. Reitz and C. J. Brand in founding a newspaper, De Zuid-Afrikaan. He was a merchant and a member of the Council of Justice for the Batavian Republic from 1803 to 1806.

Freemason
He started a Lodge called de Hoop named after his father's farm. He was interested in British Freemasonry. He was Grand Master of Lodge de Goede Hoop from 1813 to 1831. He succeeded J. A. U. de Mist as Grand Master, and Michael van Breda succeeded him in 1831.

References 

1838 deaths
1770 births
South African judges
Leiden University alumni
South African Freemasons